At least two warships of Japan have borne the name Tokitsukaze:

 , an Imperial Japanese Navy  launched in 1916 and stricken in 1935
 , an Imperial Japanese Navy  launched in 1939 and sunk in 1943

Japanese Navy ship names
Imperial Japanese Navy ship names